Southland United is an amateur association football club from Invercargill, New Zealand. They compete in the FootballSouth Premier League. Their home ground was the ILT Football Turf, Invercargill.

References

 UltimateNZSoccer website's Southland United page

External links
 Southland United Official website

Association football clubs in Invercargill
1988 establishments in New Zealand
Association football clubs established in 1988